Nicoletta Vallorani (born 7 February 1959) is an Italian science fiction writer.

Born in Offida, in the Marche region, she holds a degree in Foreign Languages with a dissertation on Contemporary American Literature, honed her writing skills as a translator and currently teaches English Language and Literature in the University of Milan, Milan.

Her work as an essayist focuses on Italian science fiction criticism, and science fiction from women in particular.

She contributed to various genre magazines, including Cosmo, La città e le stelle, Studi e ricerche sulla fantascienza and Ucronia. For Mondadori she did volume prefaces, articles, interviews, columns.

Starting in the mid-1980s she published novels and short-story collections.

She won the Premio Urania 1992 with the novel Il cuore finto di DR, a science fiction/noir cross-pollination published by Mondadori under the Urania inprint the following year, and also translated in French. She also writes noir and kids literature.

In 2012 her novel Le madri cattive won the Premio Nazionale di Narrativa Maria Teresa Di Lascia. In 2020 it was reported she was longlisted for the Premio Campiello.

Bibliography
 Il cuore finto di DR (1992)
 Dream box (1997)
 Dentro la notte, e ciao (1995)
 La fidanzata di Zorro (1999)
 Luca De Luca detto Lince (1997)
 Pagnotta e i suoi fratelli (1997)
 Ahab e Azul (1997)
 Cuore meticcio (1998)
 I misti di Sur (1998)
 Darjee (1999)
 Le sorelle sciacallo (1999)
 Occhi di lupo (2000)
 Come una balena (2000)
 La fatona (2002)
 Eva (2002)
 Visto dal cielo (2004)
 Cordelia (2006)
 Lapponi e criceti (2010)
 Le madri cattive (2011)
 Sulla sabbia di Sur (2012)
 Hope - L'ultimo segreto del fuoco (2013)
 Le sorelle sciacallo (2017)
 Avrai i miei occhi (2020)

Work translated into English

 "The Catalog of Virgins" (translated by Rachel S. Cordasco), Clarkesworld magazine (2017)

References

External links
 Vollorani's blog at Il Fatto Quotidiano (active 2012–2014)
 Biography of Vallorani in Fantascienza
 Official website  (Defunct since 2008)
 Nicoletta Vallorani profile at the Centre for the Study of Contemporary Women's Writing, Institute of Modern Languages Research

1959 births
Living people
People from the Province of Ascoli Piceno
Italian science fiction writers
Women science fiction and fantasy writers